Rangiputangatahi Mawhete  (4 March 1880 – 24 July 1961), born as William Arthur Moffatt and commonly known as Rangi Mawhete, was a New Zealand  land agent, interpreter and politician.

Early life
Of Māori descent, he identified with the Muaūpoko and Rangitāne iwi. He was born in Tiakitahuna, Manawatu/Horowhenua, New Zealand on 4 March 1880. He was a grandson of the Rangitane chief Te Aweawe, and educated at Te Aute College.

Political career
He organised a 1931 meeting between Ratana and Labour and organised the 1932 Māori Labour conference. In 1935 he warned against an exclusive Ratana-Labour alliance as dividing rather than uniting Māori.

He was a member of the Legislative Council for two terms from 9 March 1936 to 8 March 1950.

In the 1959 Queen's Birthday Honours, Mawhete was appointed an Officer of the Order of the British Empire for services to the Māori people.

References

1880 births
1961 deaths
New Zealand Labour Party MLCs
Muaūpoko people
Rangitāne people
Māori politicians
Interpreters
Māori MLCs
People educated at Te Aute College
Members of the New Zealand Legislative Council
Unsuccessful candidates in the 1914 New Zealand general election
Unsuccessful candidates in the 1922 New Zealand general election
Unsuccessful candidates in the 1925 New Zealand general election
People from Manawatū-Whanganui
New Zealand Officers of the Order of the British Empire
20th-century translators